Aurel Vernon Smith (20 June 1915 – 6 February 2011) was an Australian politician.

Aurel was born in Geelong to wool merchant William Smith and Ruby Emily Young, he was the eldest child with a younger brother Collin Smith. A keen yachtsman, he would spend weekends competing for the Royal Geelong Yacht Club winning numerous titles Phoenix Wool Company Pty Ltd. He was a director of various other companies including J. C. Taylor and Sons Pty Ltd, Coca-Cola Bottlers (Geelong) Pty Ltd, Smith Wool Co., Warrangee Pty Ltd, Ceres Lookout Estate Pty Ltd.

Aurel enlisted and served during World War II firstly in the Middle East, then to New Guinea and Borneo. He attained the rank of major for 2/2 Australian Anti Aircraft Regiment. A founding member of the Liberal Party, he was president of the Geelong branch and chairman of the Western Area finance committee. In 1967 he was elected to the Victorian Legislative Assembly for Bellarine. He switched to South Barwon in 1976 and retired in 1982.

Aurel has one son Campbell William Aurel-Smith and three grand children, Kate, Timothy and Camilla.
Smith died in 2011.

References

1915 births
2011 deaths
Liberal Party of Australia members of the Parliament of Victoria
Members of the Victorian Legislative Assembly